RTV-7 is a Dutch television network featuring programming from the Dutch Caribbean founded by Gerard Wijngaarden. Its targeted audience consists mainly of people from the former Netherlands Antilles and Suriname living in the Netherlands. Most of the programmes on RTV7 are in Papiamento, Spanish and English as they are produced by the different television channels from Latin America and the Caribbean. The channel also broadcasts the Surinamese news programme, which is in Dutch, and several RTV-7 original shows.

References

External links 
 

Television channels in the Netherlands
Television channels and stations established in 2008
Dutch Caribbean culture